Gibson Branch is a stream in Platte County in the U.S. state of Missouri. It is a tributary of the Platte River.

Gibson Branch has the name of the local Gibson family.

References

Rivers of Platte County, Missouri
Rivers of Missouri